Exoletuncus cretatus is a species of moth of the family Tortricidae. It is found in Bolivia.

The wingspan is 26 mm. Adults are similar to Exoletuncus trilobopa, but with somewhat different shapes of the black blotches on the forewings.

References

Moths described in 1997
Euliini
Moths of South America
Taxa named by Józef Razowski